The men's discus throw at the 2019 World Para Athletics Championships was held in Dubai in November 2019.

Medalists

Detailed results

F11

F37

F52

F56

F64

See also 
List of IPC world records in athletics

References 

discus throw
2019 in men's athletics
Discus throw at the World Para Athletics Championships